Richard Bourne may refer to:

 Richard Bourne (footballer) (born 1954), English footballer
 Richard Bourne (priest) (died 1817), Anglican priest in Ireland